New Generation-Day_FM is a music festival  Slovakia, first organized in 2012. The current venues are Majestic Music Club, KC Dunaj, HOPKIRK chillout & culture bar, Slovenský Rozhlas, KC Dunaj and, Ateliér Babylon. The festival features alternative music, rock, pop, dance music, world music, drum and bass.

History

2012 
The first festival took place on 10 November 2012 at 4 venues all over Bratislava. Notable artists included B-Complex, The Uniques, Bruno Benetton Free Band, The Lovely Pimps, Dynamo Team, Mike Lark, Medial Banana, King Shaolin and Italian MTV New Generation band PHINX.

See also
List of electronic music festivals
Live electronic music

References

External links and references 
 Official website
 
 
 
 

Electronic music festivals in Slovakia
Rock festivals in Slovakia
Music festivals established in 2012
Autumn events in Slovakia
Culture in Bratislava
2012 establishments in Slovakia